Bowdoin Glacier ( or Bowdoin Brae), is a glacier in northwestern Greenland. Administratively it belongs to the Avannaata municipality.

Like the fjord further south, this glacier was named by Robert Peary after Bowdoin College. He described the glacier as follows:

Geography 
The Bowdoin Glacier discharges at the head of the Bowdoin Fjord from the Greenland Ice Sheet to the northeast of Prudhoe Land.

The glacier flows roughly from NE to SW.

See also
List of glaciers in Greenland

References

External links

Identifying Spatial Variability in Greenland's Outlet Glacier Response to Ocean Heat

Glaciers of Greenland